Bühren is a municipality in the district of Göttingen, in Lower Saxony, Germany.

References 

Göttingen (district)
Bramwald